Combretum echirense is a species of flowering plant first formally named by C.C.H. Jongkind in 1993.

References

echirense